Terebratulina is a genus of brachiopods belonging to the family Cancellothyrididae. The genus has a cosmopolitan distribution.

Species
The following species are recognised in the genus Terebratulina:

Terebratulina abyssicola 
Terebratulina akitana 
Terebratulina alabamensis 
Terebratulina arabica 
Terebratulina ausroamericana 
Terebratulina australis 
Terebratulina austroamericana 
Terebratulina biauriculata 
Terebratulina brundidgensis 
Terebratulina buckmani 
Terebratulina cailleti 
Terebratulina callinome 
Terebratulina capillata 
Terebratulina carinata 
Terebratulina cavata 
Terebratulina christopheri 
Terebratulina compressa 
Terebratulina crossei 
Terebratulina cumingi 
Terebratulina edwardsi 
Terebratulina eggeri 
Terebratulina etheridgei 
Terebratulina etigoensis 
Terebratulina flexuosa 
Terebratulina gracilis 
Terebratulina hanawensis 
Terebratulina hashimotoi 
Terebratulina hataiana 
Terebratulina hawaiiensis 
Terebratulina helenae 
Terebratulina honsyuensis 
Terebratulina iduensis 
Terebratulina imbricata 
Terebratulina indomita 
Terebratulina japonica 
Terebratulina kendricki 
Terebratulina kiiensis 
Terebratulina kitakamiensis 
Terebratulina kurotakiensis 
Terebratulina kyusyuensis 
Terebratulina latifrons 
Terebratulina leeae 
Terebratulina longicollis 
Terebratulina louisianae 
Terebratulina manchionealensis 
Terebratulina meridionalis 
Terebratulina miuraensis 
Terebratulina miurensis 
Terebratulina moniwaensis 
Terebratulina nodulosa 
Terebratulina otutumiensis 
Terebratulina pacifica 
Terebratulina palmeri 
Terebratulina peculiaris 
Terebratulina perplexa 
Terebratulina photina 
Terebratulina protostriatula 
Terebratulina putiensis 
Terebratulina radula 
Terebratulina reevei 
Terebratulina retusa 
Terebratulina septentrionalis 
Terebratulina shurugaensis 
Terebratulina simosensis 
Terebratulina sirahamensis 
Terebratulina subcarinata 
Terebratulina subtilis 
Terebratulina tejonensis 
Terebratulina titibuensis 
Terebratulina tohokuensis 
Terebratulina unguicula 
Terebratulina valdiviae 
Terebratulina wardenensis 
Terebratulina whiterockensis 
Terebratulina wilsoni 
Terebratulina yabei

References

Brachiopod genera
Terebratulida